Mookhep village is located in Khliehriat Tehsil of East Jaintia Hills district in Meghalaya in India.

References

Villages in East Jaintia Hills district